Liptena alluaudi, the Alluaud's liptena, is a butterfly in the family Lycaenidae. It is found in Guinea (Nimbas), Liberia, Ivory Coast, Ghana, Togo and western Nigeria. The habitat consists of forests. The name honours Charles Alluaud.

References

Butterflies described in 1890
Liptena
Taxa named by Paul Mabille
Butterflies of Africa